Caroline Michelle "Carrie" Prejean Boller (born 1987) is an American model, former Miss California USA 2009, and Miss USA 2009 first runner-up. Prejean was stripped of her Miss California USA crown for alleged breaches of contract. Litigation between Prejean and the Miss California USA organization was settled in November 2009. Later that month, Prejean released a book relating events from her point of view.

Early years

Prejean was born in San Diego, California, to Francine (Coppola) and Wilbert Prejean. Her mother is an Italian American, and her father is of French descent.  She was raised in an evangelical household in Vista, California. In 1996, Prejean's parents separated and subsequently started divorce proceedings. According to her autobiography, Prejean considered the divorce a "trauma that irrevocably shaped the rest of my life". The divorce was a bitter one with accusations of poor behavior and homosexuality on both sides, and custody proceedings lasted an entire decade, by which time Prejean and her sister were already grown up. Prejean stated in her autobiography that her parents "were being selfish" when they broke up the family and that the divorce "put distance between me and my parents". She also explained that the divorce took a severe financial toll on the family, tarnished her childhood, and motivated her to provide her own children with a stable home.

Prejean graduated in 2005 from Vista High School. She studied at San Diego Christian College, an evangelical private school located in El Cajon, California, and attends the Rock Church, where she volunteers with their outreach ministries, including JC's Girls. Prejean also volunteers with Luv-em-Up Ministries in El Cajon, where she works with children with developmental disabilities. She studied to become a special education teacher.

Modeling

Prejean has modeled for Target, Saks Fifth Avenue, Bloomingdale's, and Nordstrom. She has also appeared in Bliss magazine, as a model for E! Entertainment Television, and in an interactive model search competition for the NBC game show Deal or No Deal. Prejean has been an ambassador for the San Diego Padres as a member of the Pad Squad since 2006.

Beauty pageants

In 2007, she competed in the Miss California USA 2008 beauty pageant and was first runner-up.

Prejean returned the following year and won the Miss California USA 2009 title, succeeding Raquel Beezley as California's representative to the Miss USA pageant. Prejean competed at the nationally televised Miss USA 2009 pageant in Las Vegas, Nevada on April 19, 2009, and placed first runner-up. Prejean's answer to her final question during the pageant became the subject of controversy.

Miss USA 2009

Prejean received nationwide attention over her response to a question about same-sex marriage during the 2009 Miss USA pageant.  Prejean was asked by pageant judge Perez Hilton whether she believed every U.S. state should legalize same-sex marriage. She responded:

The media attention intensified after Hilton added a video blog post to his website, and made comments there and elsewhere, disparaging Prejean and her answer to the question. Hilton stated: "She gave an  awful, awful answer that alienated so many people." He also told ABC News that she lost the crown because  of how she answered the question. Prejean has also stated that she believes that her answer cost her the crown.  Of that moment, Prejean has written:

Prejean stated that she was told by Miss California USA pageant officials that she "need[ed] to not talk about" her faith and was pressured to apologize for her statement.

Donald Trump, who owned most of the Miss Universe Organization, defended Prejean's answer, saying that "Miss California has done a wonderful job" and that "It wasn't a bad answer. That was simply her belief." He then added that the question was "a bit unlucky" and that no matter which way she answered the question "she was going to get killed". Several elected officials, including Gavin Newsom, mayor of San Francisco and a prominent supporter of same-sex marriage, and political pundits criticized Hilton and defended Prejean for honestly stating her personal beliefs. The New York Times opinion editorial columnist Frank Bruni said her beliefs are representative of mainstream U.S. opinion on the issue, stating "while a majority of Americans believe that gay couples should be able to enter into unions with some of the legal protections of marriage," only "a minority believe that gays and lesbians should be permitted to 'marry,' per se."

Post-Miss USA Pageant

The National Organization for Marriage used footage from the pageant for a television advertisement that warned that same-sex marriage activists wanted to silence opposition. Prejean hired a Christian public relations firm. In late April, Prejean presented an award at the Gospel Music Association's 2009 Dove Awards in Nashville, Tennessee. Prejean also spoke at Liberty University's final convocation of the year on April 29, 2009.

On May 1, 2009, Prejean stated on On the Record w/ Greta Van Susteren that she did not have an opinion on civil unions for same-sex couples, but that she supports certain rights of same-sex couples, such as hospital visitations. She has stated that she would be willing to meet with representatives from California's largest gay rights group "as long as it's not political".

Contract termination

Pageant organizers investigated Prejean for violating the terms of her contract after a photograph of Prejean partially nude with her back turned to the camera appeared on a celebrity gossip blog. Prejean defended the shots as legitimate modeling, and Miss USA owner Donald Trump agreed, stating, "We are in the 21st century. We have determined the pictures taken are fine" and that "in some cases the pictures were lovely." Trump went on to compare Prejean's views on same sex-marriage as being in line with those of President Barack Obama, and National Organization for Marriage president Maggie Gallagher stated on May 5 that the release would not affect Prejean's role with her group.

Despite his initial support, Trump agreed to terminate Prejean's contract on June 10, 2009, citing "continued breach of contract issues". Prejean claimed that K2 Productions, producers of the Miss California USA pageant, wanted her to pose for Playboy and appear on the reality television show I'm a Celebrity... Get Me out of Here!, though K2 Productions executive Keith Lewis claimed he was simply notifying Prejean of all offers for appearances.

In August 2009, Prejean sued Miss California USA officials on a variety of civil grounds, including libel, slander, religious discrimination, and the unauthorized release of private medical records. K2 Productions and pageant officials filed counterclaims seeking the profits from Prejean's forthcoming book, which it claims was written in violation of the Miss California USA contract, and the return of $5,200 loaned to Prejean for breast implants. On November 3, 2009, Prejean and K2 announced a settlement with undisclosed terms, with both sides dropping their lawsuits. CNN subsequently reported that Prejean's settlement with Miss California USA officials was prompted by the revelation of a "sex tape", a home video involving Prejean.

Writing

In November 2009, Prejean released a memoir titled Still Standing: The Untold Story of My Fight Against Gossip, Hate, and Political Attacks through conservative publisher Regnery Publishing. The book explores what Prejean believes were unfair attacks by those in the media that leaned left and what she characterized as "a vindictive smear campaign" from Hollywood, while also focusing on her conservative values. In an incident that occurred while promoting the book, Prejean left the set during an interview on Larry King Live, after King asked her why she settled her lawsuit with the Miss California USA pageant, calling the host "inappropriate".

Personal life

On July 2, 2010, Prejean married former NFL quarterback Kyle Boller in San Diego, California. On November 11, 2010, they announced that they were expecting a child in May 2011. The couple's first child arrived on May 11, a girl, followed by a son, Brody, in 2013.

Political activity  
In late August, 2021, Prejean spoke at an Encinitas, California school board meeting, announcing her plan to campaign against some of the school board members when they ran for reelection. She decried the mandatory masking at schools that was taking place in the face of the ongoing COVID-19 pandemic, stated that she would unmask her children, and that the pandemic was over. 

In 2022 she claimed on Fox News that a local school board Halloween event that had a drag queen was a front for child grooming. She stated “Every single one of these board members, we called them out for exactly who they are. They’re groomers."

References

External links

Still Standing at Regnery Publishing

Carrie Prejean's Facebook page

1987 births
21st-century American women writers
Activists from California
American people of Italian descent
American people of French descent
Beauty pageant controversies
Living people
Miss USA 2009 delegates
Female models from California
San Diego Christian College alumni
Women in California
Writers from San Diego
American evangelicals